Bredbo River, a perennial stream that is part of the Murrumbidgee catchment within the Murray–Darling basin, is located in the Monaro region of New South Wales, Australia.

Location and features

The river flows through the town of Bredbo; from where it draws its name, an Aboriginal word meaning joining of waters.

See also

References

Tributaries of the Murrumbidgee River
Rivers of New South Wales